Huntsville is an unincorporated community in Schuyler County, Illinois, United States. Huntsville is southeast of Augusta. Huntsville had a post office, which closed on September 18, 2004.

Notable people

 Chicago Cubs catcher Earl Tyree was born in Huntsville.
 Eliza Read Sunderland (1839–1910), writer, educator, lecturer, women's rights advocate; born in Huntsville

References

Unincorporated communities in Schuyler County, Illinois
Unincorporated communities in Illinois